Molde Fotballklubb, also known simply as Molde FK, is a Norwegian professional football club based in Molde. The club is affiliated with Nordmøre og Romsdal Fotballkrets and play their home games at Aker Stadion. Formed on 19 June 1911, the club have won three national league title and four national cup titles. Molde participated in the UEFA Champions League in 1999 where they met Real Madrid, Porto and Olympiacos in the group stage. This made them the second Norwegian football club, to have reached the group stage of the competition. Currently playing in Eliteserien, where the season lasts from March to November. They won their first championship in 2011, and defended the title in 2012. In 2014 they won both their third and so far last league title and the national cup. Molde also had a successful period from 1994 to 2005, when they won two Norwegian Cup titles, and finished second in the league on four occasions. Since playing their first competitive match, a number of players have made a competitive first-team appearance for the club, of whom a number of players have made between 25 and 99 appearances (including substitute appearances).

List of players
Appearances and goals are for first-team competitive matches only, including Eliteserien, 1. divisjon, Norwegian Cup, Eliteserien play-offs, Champions League, UEFA Cup/Europa League and Cup Winners' Cup.
Players are listed according to the date of their first-team debut for the club.

This list is under construction. Statistics correct as of match played 13 November 2022

Table headers
 Nationality – If a player played international football, the country/countries he played for are shown. Otherwise, the player's nationality is given as their country of birth.
 Molde career – The year of the player's first appearance for Molde FK to the year of his last appearance.
 Total – The total number of matches played, both as a starter and as a substitute.

Notes
 A utility player is one who is considered to play in more than one position.

References

 
Molde FK
Association football player non-biographical articles